The Franklin dike swarm, also called the Franklin dikes, is a Proterozoic dike swarm of the Franklin Large Igneous Province in Northern Canada. It is one of the several major magmatic events in the Canadian Shield and it was formed 723 million years ago. Areas in the Franklin have been prospected for nickel, copper, and platinum group metals.

See also
Mackenzie dike swarm
Volcanism of Canada
Volcanism of Northern Canada

References

Dike swarms
Igneous petrology of Nunavut
Neoproterozoic magmatism